The Church of Saint Anne is a French Roman Catholic church and French national domain located  in the Muslim Quarter of the Old City of Jerusalem, near the start of the Via Dolorosa, next to the Lions' Gate.

History of the site
During the Roman period a pagan shrine for the cult of the god of healing (a syncretic mix between the Egyptian god Serapis and the Greek god Asclepius), stood on the grounds next to the two Pools of Bethesda.

A Byzantine basilica was built over the remains of the shrine in the 5th century. Partially destroyed by the Persians in 614, it was subsequently restored. Baldwin I, the first titled Crusader king of Jerusalem, banished his wife Arda to the old Benedictine convent which still existed here in 1104. A small Crusader church, the so-called Moustier, was then erected over the wall separating the northern and southern Pools of Bethesda, among the ruins of the Byzantine church.

The actual Church of St Anne was built sometime between 1131 and 1138, during the reign of Queen Melisende. It was erected near the remains of the Byzantine basilica, over the site of a grotto believed by the Crusaders to be the childhood home of the Virgin Mary, mother of Jesus. It is dedicated to Anne and Joachim, the parents of Saint Mary, who according to tradition lived here.

Unlike many other Crusader churches, St. Anne's was not destroyed after the 1187 conquest of Jerusalem by Saladin (Ṣalāḥ ad-Dīn). In 1192, Ṣalāḥ ad-Dīn converted the building into a madrasa (Islamic educational institution), known as al-Madrasa as-Salahiyya (of Saladin), as is still written in the Arabic inscription above the entrance. In the 15th century it was considered as the most prestigious college in the city, counting among its more prominent students the Islamic jurist and city historian, Mujir al-Din (1456–1522).

During Muslim Ottoman rule in Palestine, Christian pilgrims were only permitted inside the grotto after paying a fee. Eventually the madrasa was abandoned and the former church building fell into disrepair. In 1856, in gratitude for French support during the Crimean War, the Ottoman sultan Abdülmecid I presented it to Napoleon III.

In 1862, the French government dispatched the architect Christophe-Edouard Mauss to Jerusalem for this purpose. In 1873, while working n the renovations, Mauss discovered the vestiges of the Bethesda Pool next to the church.

Since 1878, it has been administered by the Missionaries of Africa, a Catholic order, commonly called the "White Fathers" for the colour of their robes. Between 1882 and 1946 the site has housed a seminary for the training of Greek-Catholic priests.

Design and construction
Built between 1131 and 1138 to replace a previous Byzantine church, and shortly thereafter enlarged by several meters, the church is an excellent example of Romanesque architecture. The three-aisled basilica incorporates cross-vaulted ceilings and pillars, clear clean lines and a somewhat unadorned interior. The nave is separated from the lower lateral aisles by arcades of arches. The high altar, designed by the French sculptor Philippe Kaeppelin incorporates many different scenes. On the front of the altar are depicted the Nativity (left), the Descent from the Cross (center) and the Annunciation (right); on the left-hand end is the teaching of Mary by her mother, on the right-hand end her presentation in the Temple.  In the south aisle is a flight of steps leading down to the crypt, in a grotto believed by the Crusaders to be Mary's birthplace. An altar dedicated to Mary is located there. The Byzantine basilica was partly stretched over two water basins, collectively known as the Pools of Bethesda, and built upon a series of piers, one of which still stands today in its entirety.

In 1862, the French architect Christophe-Edouard Mauss was dispatched by his government to Jerusalem with the special assignment of restoring the time-damaged church.

Acoustics
The church's acoustics are particularly suited to Gregorian chant, which makes it a pilgrimage site for soloists and choirs.

Property
The church is listed as one of four French government properties in the Holy Land as part of the "Domaine national français". In line with international law, which treats East Jerusalem as occupied territory, France does not recognize Israeli sovereignty over East Jerusalem, where the Church of Saint Anne is located. In 1996, during Jacques Chirac's visit to Jerusalem, the French president refused to enter the church until Israeli soldiers who accompanied him left. Similarly in January 2020, French President Emmanuel Macron was involved in an altercation with Israeli security officers at the church.

See also
 History of medieval Arabic and Western European domes

References

Bibliography

 (pp. 116 - 126)
 (pp. 455, 483)
 (pp. 77, 82, 154-5)  
 (p. 14)
 (p.  6)
 (pp. 142- 156)
(p. 233-245; pl. XIV-XXV)  
  (pp. 40, 83, 428)

External links
Madrasa al-Salahiyya
Photos of the Church of Saint Anne at the Manar al-Athar photo archive

Roman Catholic churches in Jerusalem
White Fathers
Overseas France
Old City (Jerusalem)